Niclas Ekberg (born 23 December 1988) is a Swedish handballer for THW Kiel and the Swedish national team.

He was part of the Swedish team that won silver at the 2012 Summer Olympics. He was also part of the Swedish national team that won the 2022 European Championship, where he scored the final winning goal for Sweden in the last second with a penalty shot.

Before playing in Kiel he played for AG København.

Individual awards
All-Star Right wing of the World Championship: 2023

References

External links

1988 births
Living people
People from Ystad Municipality
Swedish male handball players
Expatriate handball players
Swedish expatriate sportspeople in Denmark
Swedish expatriate sportspeople in Germany
Handball players at the 2012 Summer Olympics
Olympic handball players of Sweden
Olympic silver medalists for Sweden
Olympic medalists in handball
Medalists at the 2012 Summer Olympics
Ystads IF players
THW Kiel players
Handball-Bundesliga players
Handball players at the 2020 Summer Olympics
Sportspeople from Skåne County
21st-century Swedish people